is a train station in Ikoma, Nara Prefecture, Japan.

Lines 
Kintetsu
Ikoma Line

Plat form

Around the Station 
 Ideyama Ground
 Ikoma-Haginodai Post Office

Adjacent stations

Sources

External links
 Haginodai Station (Kintetsu Corporation) 

Railway stations in Japan opened in 1980
Railway stations in Nara Prefecture